Steven Lanier McKnight is a professor and former chair of the department of biochemistry at UT Southwestern. His research is in the area of transcriptional regulation.

McKnight received his bachelor's degree from University of Texas in 1974 and his PhD from University of Virginia in 1977. He was a Howard Hughes Medical Institute Investigator from 1988 to 1992.

Criticism 
As president of the American Society for Biochemistry and Molecular Biology, McKnight published messages in the society's newsletter critical of young scientists, calling them "riff-raff" and saying that "The average scientist today is not of the quality of our predecessors”. He complains that biomedical research now attracts researchers who “never would have survived as scientists in the 1960s and 1970s", and that the funding crisis can be attributed to the NIH review committees being “undoubtedly contaminated by riff-raff”. The month prior, he had derided young scientists for being uninformed on the historic methods of biochemistry. These opinions attracted media attention and criticism from many in the scientific community. Future of Research, an advocacy group led by Jessica Polka that supports junior researchers satirised McKnight's comments by selling "Riff-raff" T-shirts, using the proceeds to fund the 2015 Future of Research conference.

Awards 
1989 Eli Lilly and Company-Elanco Research Award
1991 Award in Molecular Biology of National Academy of Sciences
1992 Member of the National Academy of Sciences
1992 Member of the American Academy of Arts and Sciences
 2004 National Institutes of Health Director's Pioneer Award
2007 Fellow of the American Association for the Advancement of Science
2014 Wiley Prize
2020 Welch Award

References 

Year of birth missing (living people)
Living people
American biochemists
University of Texas Southwestern Medical Center faculty
University of Texas at Austin College of Natural Sciences alumni
University of Virginia alumni
Members of the National Academy of Medicine